Mosocho Academy was a primary boys' boarding school admitting pupils from standard forms three to eight. In 1989, the school expanded to include the secondary wing which admitted its first batch of students in forms one and two that year.

In 1992, when the first Kenya Certificate of Secondary Education examination was sat, the school emerged as a top-twenty best in the country. From then, the schools attracted students from all over the country and beyond. Good performance continued for a time until in 1996. Decline in academic standards visited the school immediately after the death of the proprietor Dr Hon Z. T. Onyonka in 1996. However, inept financial and academic leadership drove it to almost financial ruin. It was bought in 2001, after the death of Onyonka, by an educational entrepreneur of Indian origin.

The school has undergone several changes, it stopped admitting boarding students and became a mixed secondary school.

See also

 Education in Kenya
 List of schools in Kenya

References

External links
 .  Daily Nation.
  https://web.archive.org/web/20110711121810/http://graduates.com/ys.aspx?si=290046&sy=1997*  .

1986 establishments in Kenya
Boarding schools in Kenya
Boys' schools in Kenya
Education in Nyanza Province
Educational institutions established in 1986
Elementary and primary schools in Kenya
Kisii County
Private schools in Kenya
High schools and secondary schools in Kenya